Publio Morbiducci (28 August 1889 – 31 March 1963) was an Italian sculptor. His work was part of the sculpture event in the art competition at the 1936 Summer Olympics.

He was active in projects for the Mussolini governement. In 1932, he completed most of the sculptures of the Monument to the Bersaglieri, Porta Pia, Rome. In 1937 he was named to the Accademia di San Luca and in 1938 his Discus thrower at Rest was added to the statues of the Stadio dei Marmi. In 1939, he completes the marble frieze of the Palazzo degli Uffici all'EUR.

References

Bibliography
 Publio Morbiducci. Pitture, sculture, medaglie, catalogo della mostra all'Accademia Nazionale di S. Luca, ed. N. Cardano, Edizioni De Luca, 1999
 Publio Morbiducci. Sculture dipinti disegni, introduction by C. Strinati, Artemide edizioni, 2000
 Il corpo in corpo, ed. B. Mantura, Spoleto, 1990
 Vittorio Sgarbi (ed.), Scultura italiana del primo Novecento, Bologna, Grafis Edizioni, 1993, pp. 174–175, SBN IT\ICCU\CFI\0264302
 Publio Morbiducci, Disegni, ed. Nicoletta Cardano, Ed. Bottarel & Fol, Brescia, 2007
 Publio Morbiducci, catalogo ragionato dell'opera xilografica, ed. F. Parisi, Ed. TIF, Crocetta di Montello (TV), 2013

External links
 

1889 births
1963 deaths
20th-century Italian sculptors
20th-century Italian male artists
Italian male sculptors
Olympic competitors in art competitions
Artists from Rome